Peter Brand (born 16 May 1947) is a British retired general practitioner and former Liberal Democrat politician.

Early life
Brand studied at Thornbury Grammar School and the University of Birmingham Medical School.

Political career
Brand was elected to the Isle of Wight Council in 1984.

He was elected Member of Parliament for the Isle of Wight at the 1997 general election after coming second in 1992, but lost his seat to the Conservatives at the 2001 election. During his time in parliament his voting record shows he often rebelled against the majority vote of his party.

Personal life
Brand practised as a GP in Brading and Lake for many years but is now retired. In 2000, he was investigated by the police over the death of a child patient in 1973, but was cleared of wrongdoing.

He lives with his wife, Jane, also a retired GP.

References

External links 
 
Guardian Politics Ask Aristotle - Peter Brand
TheyWorkForYou.com - Peter Brand
The Public Whip - Peter Brand voting record

1947 births
Living people
Liberal Democrats (UK) MPs for English constituencies
UK MPs 1997–2001
Members of Parliament for the Isle of Wight